Dungna  is a town in Chukha District in southwestern Bhutan.

References

External links 
Satellite map at Maplandia.com

Populated places in Bhutan